Parliamentary elections were held in Kiribati on 22 August 2007 and 30 August 2007, within 23 constituencies (electoral districts) to elect 44 MPs (43,000 citizens vote). Two other MPs are ex officio members (not elected).

There were 146 candidates in the first round, including all 44 sitting MPs, among them President Anote Tong. Most of them represent Pillars of Truth or Protect the Maneaba.

The main issues were education and employment.

Results
Eighteen seats were decided in the first round (including that of Tong, who was overwhelmingly re-elected). Tong's Pillars of Truth and allies independents got twelve of the eighteen seats. For the twenty-six seats where no candidate received a majority, a second round was held on 30 August.

References

External links
Parliament of Kiribati - Members (on the Parliament of Kiribati's official website)
Parliament of Kiribati – Members (on TSKL.net.ki)

Elections in Kiribati
Kiribati
Parliamentary election
Election and referendum articles with incomplete results